The 2017–18 Sydney Thunder season will be the 7th season in the club's history. Coached by Paddy Upton and captained by Shane Watson, the Thunder will compete in the 2017–18 Big Bash League.

Ladder

Squad 

 (c) = Captain
 (os) = Overseas Player

Matches

Match 1

Match 2

Match 3

Match 4

Match 5

Match 6

Match 7

Match 8

Match 9

Match 10

References

Big Bash League
2017–18 Big Bash League
Sydney Thunder seasons